Al-Sultan Muthey Kalaminja Siri Bavana Abaarana Mahaa Radun (Dhivehi: އައްސުލްޠާން މުތެއި ކަލަމިންޖާ ސިރީ ބަވަނަ އަބާރަނަ މަހާ ރަދުން) was the Sultan of the Maldives from 1166 to 1185. He was the son of Mulee Maavaa Kilege (Dhivehi: މުލީމާވާކިލެގެ), the maternal aunt of Sultan Dhovemi and sister of King Koimala. He ruled for 19 years and was succeeded by Ali I also of the Theemuge Dynasty of Maldivian sultans.

12th-century sultans of the Maldives